The CCHA Most Valuable Player in Tournament is an annual award given out at the conclusion of the Central Collegiate Hockey Association conference tournament to the most valuable player in the championship, as voted by the coaches of each CCHA team.

The Most Valuable Player in Tournament was first awarded in 1972, but was not conferred again until 1982. After that time, it had been bestowed every year until 2013 when the original CCHA was dissolved as a consequence of the Big Ten Conference forming its men's ice hockey conference. In 2020, the CCHA was revived by seven schools that had been members of the Western Collegiate Hockey Association, with conference play starting in 2021–22. The conference tournament returned at that time, and the MVP award was intended to return as well.

However, the award was not presented in the revived league's first tournament in 2022, presumably due to the unusual finish of the championship final. Minnesota State scored what appeared to be the winning goal in overtime against Bemidji State and was presented the championship trophy. However, the goal was being reviewed during the presentation, and officials were provided additional television camera angles that conclusively proved the goal should not have counted. The goal was rescinded about an hour after play ended, and the teams were called back to resume play. Minnesota State scored the undisputed winning goal shortly thereafter.

In 1998, the most valuable player award for the CCHA Men's Ice Hockey Tournament was renamed the Bill Beagan Trophy.

Only Ryan Miller managed to capture the award more than once.

Award winners

Note: * recipient not on championship team

Winners by school

Winners by position

See also
CCHA Awards
CCHA Men's Ice Hockey Tournament
List of CCHA Men's Ice Hockey Tournament champions

References

General

Specific

External links
CCHA Awards (Incomplete) 

College ice hockey trophies and awards in the United States